The Little Rainy River is an  tributary of the Rainy River in the northern part of the Lower Peninsula of Michigan.  Via the Rainy River, the Black River, and the Cheboygan River, its waters flow to Lake Huron.

See also
List of rivers of Michigan

References

Michigan  Streamflow Data from the USGS

Rivers of Michigan
Rivers of Presque Isle County, Michigan
Tributaries of Lake Huron